The 700s decade ran from January 1, 700, to December 31, 709.

Significant people
 Abd al-Malik
 Al-Walid I
 Abd al-Aziz ibn Marwan
 Justinian II

References